USS Cossack has been the name of more than one United States Navy ship, and may refer to:

 , part of the Stone Fleet during the American Civil War.
 , a patrol boat in commission from 1917 to 1919

See also
 
 From 1800 to the present, at least 33 ships have been named Cossack in GB (21 ships), USA (4 ships), Russia (7 ships) (see list of ships named Cossack

United States Navy ship names